Aurore (along with the Duc du Maine), was a slave ship that brought the first African slaves to Louisiana on 6 June 1719, from Senegambia.

Voyage 
Captain Herpin sailed Aurore from Saint-Malo in July 1718, bound for the Bight of Benin. She arrived off the coast of Africa on 28 August. Herpin first gathered slaves at Whydah (Ouidah) and then at Cape Lahou. He sailed from Africa on 30 November, and arrived at Louisiana on 6 June 1719. Herpin had embarked 201 slaves and despite the length of the voyage, disembarked 200 slaves. By contrast, 11 crew members died on the journey. Aurore arrived back in France, at Lorient, on 4 October.

Information
Sketches from a later Aurore illustrate some aspects of the practices of the slave trade. The slaves on ships such as Aurore (1719), were packed in a tight spoon-like position in order to be able to carry as many slaves as possible. The slaves wore leg shackles to reduce the risk of an uprising.

References

See also

Duc du Maine (slave ship)

Louisiana (New France)
Senegalese-American history 
Gambian-American history
Togolese-American history
Beninese-American history
Slave ships
Sailing ships
Slavery in the United States
History of slavery in Louisiana
1710s in New France
1719 in North America
First arrivals in the United States